Padala Glacier is the  long and  wide glacier in Bangey Heights on the east side of the main ridge of north-central Sentinel Range in Ellsworth Mountains, Antarctica.  It is situated northwest of Kopsis Glacier and east-southeast of Marsa Glacier.  The glacier drains the northeast slopes of Bezden Peak and the southeast slopes of Golemani Peak, flows northeastwards and joins Embree Glacier northwest of Mount Hleven.

The glacier is named after the settlement of Padala in Western Bulgaria.

Location
US mapping in 1961 and 1988.

See also
 List of glaciers in the Antarctic
 Glaciology

Maps
 Vinson Massif.  Scale 1:250 000 topographic map.  Reston, Virginia: US Geological Survey, 1988.
 Antarctic Digital Database (ADD). Scale 1:250000 topographic map of Antarctica. Scientific Committee on Antarctic Research (SCAR). Since 1993, regularly updated.

References
 Padala Glacier SCAR Composite Gazetteer of Antarctica
 Bulgarian Antarctic Gazetteer. Antarctic Place-names Commission. (details in Bulgarian, basic data in English)

External links
 Padala Glacier. Copernix satellite image

Glaciers of Ellsworth Land
Bulgaria and the Antarctic